Lee Jung-bin is a South Korean football midfielder who plays for FC Anyang.

References

1995 births
Living people
Association football midfielders
South Korean footballers
Incheon United FC players
FC Anyang players
Gimcheon Sangmu FC players
K League 1 players
K League 2 players